Gondysia is a genus of moths in the family Erebidae.

Taxonomy
Neadysgonia was proposed, revised, and removed from the Old World genus Dysgonia by Sullivan in 2010 and was later placed as a synonym of Gondysia.

Species
 Gondysia consobrina (Guenée, 1852)
 Gondysia similis (Guenée, 1852)
 Gondysia smithii (Guenée, 1852)
 Gondysia telma Sullivan, 2010

References

Natural History Museum Lepidoptera genus database

Poaphilini
Moth genera